The 1965–66 Copa del Generalísimo was the 64th staging of the Spanish Cup. The competition began on 24 October 1965 and ended on 29 May 1966 with the final.

First round

|}
Tiebreaker

|}

Round of 32

|}
Tiebreaker

|}

Round of 16

|}
Tiebreaker

|}

Quarter-finals

|}

Semi-finals

|}

Final

|}

External links
 rsssf.com
 linguasport.com

Copa del Rey seasons
Copa del Rey
Copa